The Compton Building is a historic building at 159, 161-175 Devonshire Street and 18-20 Arch Street in Boston, Massachusetts. The eleven-story Classical Revival office tower was built in 1902–03 to a design by Henry Forbes Bigelow of Winslow & Bigelow.  

It was connected by internal connections to the adjacent International Trust Company Building in 1961, when the two buildings were under common ownership. The building now houses the Club Quarters Hotel.

The building was listed on the National Register of Historic Places in 2008.

See also
National Register of Historic Places listings in northern Boston, Massachusetts

References

External links
Club Quarters Boston

Neoclassical architecture in Massachusetts
Office buildings completed in 1902
Skyscraper hotels in Boston
National Register of Historic Places in Boston
Office buildings on the National Register of Historic Places in Massachusetts
1902 establishments in Massachusetts